Wei, known in historiography as the Western Wei, was an imperial dynasty of China that followed the disintegration of the Northern Wei. One of the Northern dynasties during the era of the Northern and Southern dynasties, it ruled the western part of northern China from 535 to 557. As with the Northern Wei dynasty that preceded it, the ruling family of the Western Wei were members of the Tuoba clan of the Xianbei.

History
After the Xianbei general Yuwen Tai killed the Northern Wei emperor Yuan Xiu, he installed Yuan Baoju as emperor of Western Wei while Yuwen Tai would remain as the virtual ruler. Although smaller than the Eastern Wei in territory and population, Western Wei was able to withstand the attacks from the eastern empire, most notably at the Battle of Shayuan in 537. Due to its better economical conditions, Western Wei was even able to conquer the whole western part of the Liang empire in the south and occupied the territory of modern Sichuan. In 557 Yuwen Tai's nephew Yuwen Hu deposed Emperor Gong and placed Yuwen Tai's son Yuwen Jue on the throne, ending Western Wei and establishing Northern Zhou.

Religion and art
Buddhism and Buddhist art flourished under the Western Wei, even though the dynasty along lasted twenty-two years. Western Wei caves opened at Dunhuang and Maijishan.

Rulers

References

Citations

Sources 

 History of Northern Dynasties.
 Zizhi Tongjian.

 
States and territories established in the 530s
States and territories disestablished in the 550s
Dynasties in Chinese history
Former countries in Chinese history
535 establishments
6th-century establishments in China
557 disestablishments
6th-century disestablishments in China